Gogarth railway station served a sparsely populated area on the north shore of the Dyfi estuary in the Welsh county of Merionethshire.

History

Opened by the Great Western Railway on 9 July 1923 and originally named Gogarth Halt, it had a short wooden platform with no shelter. The station passed on to the London Midland Region of British Railways on nationalisation in 1948. Renamed Gogarth on 6 May 1968, services were suspended from 14 May 1984 due to the deteriorating structural condition of the platform and cost of repairs needed.
The station was officially closed by the British Railways Board on 30 September 1985.

The site today

Trains on the Cambrian Line pass the site of the former halt but there is no trace of its existence. Only the access path leading from a lay-by on the A493 road exists.

Notes

References

External links
Station on navigable O. S. map

Disused railway stations in Ceredigion
Former Great Western Railway stations
Railway stations in Great Britain opened in 1923
Railway stations in Great Britain closed in 1985
1923 establishments in Wales